('Duty/Shame') is a British crime drama television series which premiered on BBC Two in the United Kingdom on 17 October 2019, and was released internationally on Netflix on 10 January 2020. A co-production between the BBC and Netflix, the series was created and written by Joe Barton, and features an international ensemble cast including Takehiro Hira, Kelly Macdonald, Yōsuke Kubozuka, Will Sharpe, Masahiro Motoki, Justin Long, Anna Sawai, and Charlie Creed-Miles. The series is set in London and Tokyo, with dialogue in English and Japanese. In September 2020, it was cancelled by BBC Two and Netflix.

Synopsis
Kenzo Mori (Takehiro Hira), a Tokyo detective, travels to London in search of his brother, Yuto (Yōsuke Kubozuka), who was previously assumed to be dead. Yuto has been accused of murdering the nephew of a Yakuza member, which threatens to start a gang war in Tokyo. As Kenzo attempts to navigate the unfamiliar territory of London to uncover whether his brother is alive and guilty, he becomes acquainted with DC Sarah Weitzmann (Kelly Macdonald) of the Metropolitan Police and Rodney Yamaguchi (Will Sharpe), a young half-Japanese, half-British sex worker. While searching for Yuto in London, Kenzo must also support his family back home in Tokyo. Kenzo's investigation brings him into contact with dangerous elements of London's criminal underworld.

Cast and characters
 Takehiro Hira as Kenzo Mori (Japanese: 森健三, Mori Kenzō), a Tokyo police detective who travels to London to search for his missing brother
 Kelly Macdonald as Sarah Weitzmann, a Detective Constable alienated within the Metropolitan Police
 Yōsuke Kubozuka as Yuto Mori (Japanese: 森勇人, Mori Yūto), Kenzo's younger brother and a member of the Yakuza
 Will Sharpe as Rodney Yamaguchi, a charismatic half-Japanese, half-British rent boy and drug addict living in London
 Aoi Okuyama as Taki Mori (Japanese: 森多喜, Mori Taki), Kenzo's rebellious 16-year-old daughter
 Masahiro Motoki as Fukuhara (Japanese: 福原, Fukuhara), a Yakuza boss
 Charlie Creed-Miles as Connor Abbot, a gangster based in London who is fascinated by Japanese culture.
 Justin Long as Ellis Vickers, an American who has a business partnership with Abbot
 Sophia Brown as Donna Clark, an assassin working for Abbot
 Yūko Nakamura as Rei (Japanese: レイ, Rei), Kenzō's wife
 Mitsuko Oka as Natsuko (Japanese: なつこ, Natsuko), mother of Kenzō and Yūto
 Katsuya as Toshio (Japanese: としお, Toshio), Kenzō's partner in the Tokyo Police Department
 Kazuyuki Tsumura as Chief Inspector Hayashi (Japanese: 林, Hayashi), Kenzo and Toshio's boss
 Katsuya Kobayashi as Shin Endo (Japanese: 遠藤慎, Endō Shin), a Yakuza boss and Fukuhara's rival
 Tony Pitts as Steve Angling, a detective inspector and Sarah's boss
 Anna Sawai as Eiko (Japanese: 栄子, Eiko), Fukuhara's daughter, who has a romantic relationship with Yuto
 Tony Way as Roy, a detective from the Metropolitan Police who is in Tokyo on an exchange programme
 Togo Igawa as Hotaka Mori (Japanese: 森穂高, Mori Hotaka), father of Kenzō and Yūto
 Yoshiki Minato as Jiro (Japanese: 次郎, Jirō), one of Fukuhara's top enforcers
 Jamie Draven as Ian Summers, Sarah's ex-boyfriend and a former Detective Constable in the Metropolitan Police
 John McCrea as Tiff, Rodney's ex-boyfriend
 Ellie James as Annie, Rodney's friend and Taki's love interest

Production

Development
Giri/Haji was announced in May 2017 as one of several new commissions by the BBC's Controller of Drama, Piers Wenger, alongside Informer, The War of the Worlds, Black Narcissus, A Suitable Boy, Little Women, A Very English Scandal, Come Home and Mrs Wilson for BBC One. In August 2018, it was confirmed that Giri/Haji would air on BBC Two. Wenger described the series as "unlike anything we've ever seen before on British TV".

Filming
Filming began in London around August 2018, and continued in Hastings in March 2019. Filming also took place in Tokyo.

Series lead Takehiro Hira commented on the challenging nature of shooting the bilingual script: "We did have some hard times with the translation... Little nuances on the text didn’t match, or didn’t translate well. So we went back and forth with Joe and the director. It was a challenge, but one we enjoyed."

Episodes

Critical reception
Giri/Haji received critical acclaim. 100% of 22 critic reviews collected by Rotten Tomatoes are positive for the series, earning an average rating of 9.06/10. The consensus on the website reads, "Smart, suspenseful, and superbly shot, Giri/Haji is a near-perfect crime thriller with a surprisingly sharp sense of humor."

Writing for the Radio Times, Patrick Cremona described Giri/Haji as a "breath of fresh air" and a "masterful and sprawling thriller", awarding the series five stars out of five. The Times critic Carol Migley awarded the opening episode four stars out of five, while The Daily Telegraph reviewer Michael Hogan gave it five stars out of five, describing it as "impressionistic, playful and unashamedly arty", as well as "bold, bewitching and slightly bonkers". The New Yorker included the series in an article about the best programmes available on streaming services, with reviewer Doreen St. Félix writing: "violently stylish, and also plain violent, Giri/Haji is a filial drama crossed with a sprawling, sexy police thriller". The Guardian'''s Lucy Mangan was more critical, awarding the series three out of five stars based on a partial viewing. Mangan complimented the "unfetishised" portrayal of Japan, but described the series as "a bore" and criticised the more familiar genre tropes. David Cirone of J-Generation criticized the series as going "heavy on theme, light on story", and NPR's Fresh Air'' critic John Powers noted that the show's "excesses can get a bit silly".

References

External links

 
 
 
 Interview about Giri/Haji with writer Joe Barton

2019 British television series debuts
2019 British television series endings
2010s British drama television series
2010s British television miniseries
BBC television dramas
English-language television shows
Japanese-language Netflix original programming
Television shows set in London
Television shows set in Tokyo
Works about the Yakuza